Izvestkovy (Çerettü) is a rural locality (a settlement) in Ust-Muninskoye Rural Settlement of Mayminsky District, the Altai Republic, Russia. The population was 46 in 2016. There are five streets.

Geography 
Ust-Muny is the nearest rural locality.

References 

Rural localities in Mayminsky District